Lamerica is a 1994 Italian drama film directed by Gianni Amelio.  It entered the competition at the 51st Venice International Film Festival, in which Amelio won the Golden Osella for Best Director. The film was selected as the Italian entry for the Best Foreign Language Film at the 67th Academy Awards, but was not accepted as a nominee.

Plot
The film Lamerica is a story of two men caught up in the startup of a scam shoe company. The main characters Gino and Spiro (later discovered to be Michele), go on an adventure of misfortune. Gino is a young man originally from Sicily who is involved in a company that is trying to “give every Albanian good shoes,” but it truly is a scam.  Mr. Fiore (Gino’s boss) and Gino were unsatisfied with the officials that were originally set up to run the company. With the help of an Albanian middleman, they decided to find their own candidate who would be a “man of straw”, meaning he would do what they say.  Spiro, or Michele, was the old man that the company hired to be their Albanian figurehead “chairman” of the company. We later learn that Spiro was a Sicilian named Michele and the problems ensued.

This film compares and contrasts the old Italian man and the young Italian man and their seemingly varying identities as two men. The major contrast between the two is not the country in which they are from, but the time period in which they lived. Spiro is from the “old” Italy, where fascism and a hard life was all he knew, and Gino is from the “new” boom years where the emphasis is on money and materialistic items. This difference is substantially indicated throughout the film. This adventure unravels Spiro's tragic personal history and allows Gino to become intimately acquainted with the full extent of Albanian poverty. This Albanian poverty is a mirror of how Italy used to be during Spiro's time. Gino's car tires are stolen, while the fancy shoes he gave Spiro are also stolen by children. Gino and Spiro follow a group of Albanians who are headed for Italy in search for a better life, first by truck and later by ship. The Albanian exodus parallels that of Italians for the United States, which is where Spiro believes that they are heading.

The Question of Italian Identity in Lamerica

Example Scene 1 
One of the first questions Gino and Fiore ask Spiro is “how old are you?” The old man holds up 10 fingers twice, communicating that he is 20 years old. In this scene, we see the old man struggling with his identity. He doesn’t know his own age, which is alarming for the viewer. Because Spiro thinks he hasn’t changed and is still 20 years old, we see he is fixed in an older generation. We will eventually learn in the film that Spiro represents the “old” Italy.  In the scene where Gino is in the hospital with Spiro, the nurse says something about his papers which prompts Gino to say the words “Maybe he was Italian before, but he’s Albanian now.” Even though Gino says this about Spiro’s papers, what he truly means is that there is nothing Gino can see in him that identifies him as Italian in his eyes. Gino only knows the “new” Italy, filled with materialistic wants and its society’s representation of status. Spiro embodies the “old” Italy, which Gino is completely unfamiliar with. Spiro is still stuck in this past “old” Italy. Gino determined that Spiro has lost his identity as an Italian, because Italians have changed with the times and Spiro has not.

Example Scene 2 
In the scene in the Albanian countryside, Gino experiences one of the first signs he might be losing his Italian identity when enters a store and emerges to find someone has taken the tires off of his car. The Albanians were always interested in this materialistic item. As the embodiment of the “new” consumer-driven Italy, he is used to everyone having cars and is surprised when the poor Albanians vandalized his property. Gino complains and threatens the people around him, but no one understands him because they do not speak Italian or do not care. He then tries to explain that he needs the police and, when an Albanian man does not understand him, he gets increasingly frustrated that no one speaks his language. Nobody here can speak Italian, his native tongue. Gino realizes that his message doesn’t resonate with the Albanians. Gino begins to lose who he is here because by speaking in his primary language, he realized no one can understand him and his threats do not have an impact.

Example Scene 3 
The next scene we see Gino having to verify his Italian identity and Spiro reaffirming his. When they get off the bus, the police try to grab them and escort them away, but Gino calls out “Let go, we are Italians” and the police do so. Gino uses this phrase not only as a way of confirming they are Italians, but also as a sense of entitlement to distinguish him from the Albanians. Gino has finally admitted that Spiro is an Italian, and helps validate Spiro’s identity as an Italian. On the other hand, Gino having to tell them he is Italian is a way for him to reaffirm his Italian identity; that he is an Italian and not any ordinary Albanian. Next, Spiro opens up to who he really is to Gino. In this scene, we see him regaining his identity.  At a certain point, Spiro says “Paisa, I am from Sicily. My name is Michele.” Finally confirming who he is, Michele seems to be regaining his identity as an Italian and establishing a connection with Gino, a fellow Sicilian.

Example Scene 4 
When Gino tries to get back to the hotel, the police grab Gino and once again he calls out “Let go of me, I am Italian”, but this time they do not. Has Gino completely lost who he is as an Italian? Does being an Italian even matter? Instead of letting Gino go back to his home country, they haul him away to an Albanian prison. Gino is forced to sign a confessional, claiming his role in the shoe scam in order to get released. The officer tells him he must leave Albania immediately. Gino reaches for his passport, and the man denies him. Gino questions “How will I get home without a passport?”, but what he really means is “How will they know I’m Italian?” Gino can no longer confirm his Italian identity, and leaves dejected.

Conclusion 
Gino finds a way to board a very packed boat back to Italy. On that boat we see Michele, smiling and happy, while Gino is sullen and depressed. It seems that Michele has found who he is, a proud and generous Italian. The scene flashes to Gino, who has lost everything he has ever known and with that, his identity as well. In the end, the fact that they are leaning on one another shows the interdependence on each other. The “new” Italy must rely on the “old” Italy to thrive and be successful. Michele as the “old” Italy, becomes a learning experience and the foundation for Gino, the “new” Italy. This final scene shows how the intermingling of tradition in the “old” Italy balances out the economically developed “new” Italy.

Awards
 1994 European Film Awards – "Best Film"
 1994 Venice Film Festival – 4 Awards including "Best Director"
 1995 São Paulo International Film Festival – "Critics Award"
 1995 David di Donatello: Best Cinematography, Best Score, Best Sound
 1995 Nastro d'Argento: Best Director, Best Cinematography
 1995 Goya Awards – Best European Film

Critical and scholarly reception

TV Guide gives the film four stars, finding it "A boldly chilling portrait of post-Communist Europe in moral eclipse, directed with passion and singular grace by Italian Gianni Amelio (STOLEN CHILDREN)." Janet Maslin, writing for The New York Times, finds that "The film's synthesis of fact and fiction is gracefully achieved," and expressed hope that after the screening of Lamerica at the 1995 New York Film Festival, Amelio would "emerge ... much more widely known."
A detailed analysis of the film can be read here.

See also
 Tirana Year Zero
 Vlora (ship)
Albanians in Italy
 Movies about immigration to Italy
 List of submissions to the 67th Academy Awards for Best Foreign Language Film
 List of Italian submissions for the Academy Award for Best Foreign Language Film

References

External links
 

1994 films
1994 drama films
Italian drama films
Italian road movies
1990s Italian-language films
Albanian-language films
Films directed by Gianni Amelio
Films about immigration
European Film Awards winners (films)
Films set in Albania
French drama films
Austrian drama films
Swiss drama films
1990s French films